Bernard "Barney" Samuel (March 9, 1880 – January 12, 1954) was a Republican politician who served as the 89th Mayor of Philadelphia from 1941 to 1952. He is to date the last Republican elected mayor of Philadelphia.

Political career

Ascension to the office of Mayor
Samuel first won election to city council in 1923. When in 1939 George Connell, then president of city council, became acting mayor upon the death of S. Davis Wilson, Samuel ascended to the position of president pro tempore. Upon the death in August 1941 of Mayor Robert Lamberton, however, Samuel assumed the mayoralty for the remainder of Lamberton's term.

Mayoral tenure

Samuel won re-election to the mayor's office in 1943 and 1947, defeating Democrats William Bullitt and Richardson Dilworth respectively, to become the first multi-term mayor since William Stokley, who served from 1872 through 1881. His mayoral tenure was the longest in Philadelphia's history. He supported the creation of a city sales tax and was instrumental in creating a city wage tax. In defending the political machine he served, Samuel prepared the city for reform by endorsing creation of Philadelphia's highly touted City Planning Commission and supporting 1947's Better Philadelphia Exhibition, which subjected the failures of a "corrupt and contented" Republican political machine to harsh scrutiny and made the elections of 1949 and 1951 for city controller and mayor, respectively, landmarks in the city's political history.

1944 transit strike

Samuel took an active role in trying to quell the 1944 transit strike that beset the city. He closed all alcohol-selling establishments, and Governor Edward Martin followed suit and closed the state liquor stores in the area. The city deployed its full police force, with extra police officers posted at major intersections and other vital points. The NAACP, as well as other black civic groups, worked energetically to maintain calm among the black people of Philadelphia. They distributed more than 100,000 posters in black sections of the city, which read "Keep Your Heads and Your Tempers! ... Treat other people as you would be treated". The six-day strike was triggered by the decision of the Philadelphia Transportation Company (PTC), made under prolonged pressure from the federal government in view of significant labor shortages, to allow black employees of the PTC to hold non-menial jobs, such as motormen and conductors, that were previously reserved for white workers only. It represents one of the most high-profile instances of the federal government invoking the Smith–Connally Act. The Act had been passed in 1943 over President Roosevelt's veto.

Samuel was succeeded by Democrat reformist mayors Joe Clark, later a U.S. Senator, and Richardson Dilworth, later a Democratic candidate for governor.

Death and legacy
Samuel is buried at Arlington Cemetery suburban Drexel Hill, Pennsylvania. He remains the last Republican Mayor of Philadelphia.

References

External links

1880 births
1954 deaths
Mayors of Philadelphia
Pennsylvania Republicans
Philadelphia City Council members
Articles containing video clips
20th-century American politicians
Burials at Arlington Cemetery (Pennsylvania)